Atosioides rochei is a species of moth of the family Limacodidae. It is found on Borneo, Sumatra and Peninsular Malaysia.

The length of the forewings is about 11 mm. The forewing pattern consists of an oblique dark medial band and a paler band. There are also four curved dark lines.

References 

Limacodidae
Moths of Asia
Moths described in 1986